A Vote for the King of the Romans is a 2016 Czech historical television film directed by Václav Křístek. It chronicles the early life of Charles IV and his relationship with his father John of Bohemia.

Cast
Kryštof Hádek as Charles IV
Stanislav Majer as John of Bohemia
Petr Jeništa as Bušek
Tereza Voříšková as Blanche of Valois
Marián Geišberg as Baldwin of Luxembourg
Norbert Lichý as Wolfram
Luboš Veselý as Pierre Rosiéres
Hana Vagnerová as Elizabeth of Bohemia 
Petr Štěpán as Louis IV, Holy Roman Emperor
Jaroslav Plesl as Dobeš z Bechyně

References

External links
 
 Official website

2016 television films
2016 films
2010s Czech-language films
Czech biographical films
Czech historical films
Films about elections
Czech television films
Charles IV, Holy Roman Emperor
Czech Television original films
2010s biographical films
2010s historical films